Jeffrey Lynn Campbell (born September 17, 1966) is an American politician from Virginia. A member of the Republican Party, Campbell is the member of the Virginia House of Delegates for the 6th district. He is from Saltville, Virginia. He also teaches state and local government law at the Appalachian School of Law.

In 2021, Campbell was one of three Republicans who voted to abolish Virginia's death penalty.

Election Results

References

External links
 

Living people
Republican Party members of the Virginia House of Delegates
Place of birth missing (living people)
1966 births
21st-century American politicians
People from Saltville, Virginia